Arthur Wallace McGregor (1863 Cirencester, bapt. 25 Sept, 6.9.1931 Banbury) was a British Christian missionary, Royal Army Chaplain and lexicographer. McGregor is mostly known for his work in Kenya Kikuyu territories. McGregor arrived in Kenya in 1892 with the CMS Missionary Taveta, Thungiri, Nairobi. Bicycling from kabete, he was the first minister of the European congregation in Nairobi around 1900. McGregor founded the Weithaga and Kahuhia (1906) Missions in the early 1900s. He was still working in Kenya in 1918. McGregor is mostly known for his English-Kiguyu dictionary.

References 

Christian missionaries